Entente Sportive Sétifienne, known as Entente de Sétif, commonly referred to as ES Sétif or ESS for short, is an Algerian professional football club based in Sétif. The club was founded in 1958 and its colours are black and white. Their home stadium, the Stade 8 Mai 1945, has a capacity of 18,000 spectators. The club is currently playing in the Algerian Ligue Professionnelle 1.

ESS is one of the most successful clubs in Algeria, having won the Algerian Ligue Professionnelle 1 eight times and the Algerian Cup a record of eight times. They are also one of only three Algerian clubs to have won the CAF Champions League, winning it twice in 1988 and 2014. They have also won the Arab Champions League twice, in 2007 and 2008, as well as three North African Cups in 2009 and 2010. In 2015, they became the first Algerian club to win the CAF Super Cup since its creation in 1993.

ES Sétif became CAF Champions League champion by defeating DR Congo's AS Vita Club in the 2014 final; and the reigning CAF Super Cup champions, by beating Egypt's Al Ahly in the 2015 Super Cup and the reigning Algerian Ligue Professionnelle 1 champions.

History
The club was founded in 1958 by Ali Benaouda and Ali Layass as Entente Sportive Sétifienne (ESS), the name was later changed to Entente Pétroliers Sétifienne (EPS) in 1977, and again in 1984 it became known as Entente Plastique Sétifienne (EPS) and was then later changed back to Entente Sportive Sétifienne (ESS).

The first colours of the club were green and the white, and following a confrontation with the French Army in a match with FC Gadir on May 8, 1945 colours changed to black and white  as mourning for the events on this day. The Guessab Stadium was the original name for the club's home.

ES Sétif is one of the prestigious top flight Algerian clubs. The club has won the Algerian Cup 8 times, and is the only Algerian team to have won the Afro-Asia cup, in 1989 in Qatar.

Since its foundation, ES Sétif has had 19 presidents, the first being Ibrahim Dokomi. The current president is Hassan Hammar.

African success
In 1988, ES Sétif won the African Cup of Champions Clubs by beating Iwuanyanwu Nationale of Nigeria 4–1 on aggregate in the final. After losing the first leg 1–0 in Liberty Stadium, Ibadan, ES Sétif scored 4 goals in the return leg in Constantine to lift the trophy. ES Sétif were playing in the Algerian second division at time and are the only club in Africa to date to have won the African Cup of Champions Clubs while not being in the top flight.

By winning the 1988 African Cup of Champions Clubs, ES Sétif qualified for the 1989 Afro-Asian Club Championship, where they faced Al-Sadd of Qatar, winners of the 1988–89 Asian Club Championship. ES Sétif won both legs, 2–0 at home and 3–1 in Doha, to lift the trophy. They are the only Algerian club to have won the competition.

On June 29, 2010, ES Sétif became the first fully professional club in Algeria.

On  August 8, 2010, ES Sétif defeated CS Sfaxien of Tunisia 1–0 to win the first-ever edition of the UNAF Super Cup.

Crest

Shirt sponsor & kit manufacturer

Honours

Performance in CAF competitions

Total standings of African Cup participations (1963–2022)

Pos. = Position; Pld = Matches played; W = Won; D = Drawn; L = Lost; GF = Goals for; GA = Goals against; Pa. = Participation; Pld = Matches played
CSC = CAF Super Cup; CCL = CAF Champions League; CCWC = CAF Cup Winners' Cup' Cup;
CAC = CAF Cup; CCC = CAF Confederation Cup

CAF Champions League: 12 appearances

1987 – Second Round
1988 – Champion
1989 – First Round
2008 – First Round
2010 – Quarter-finals

2011 – Third Round
2013 – Third Round
2014 – Champion
2015 – Group Stage
2016 – Group Stage -Disqualified

2018 – Semi-finals
2022 – Semi-finals

CAF Confederation Cup: 4 appearances

2009 – Finalist
2011 – Second Round of 8

2012 – First Round
2013 – Group Stage

CAF Cup Winners' Cup: 2 appearances

1981 – Quarter-finals
1991 – Semi-finals

CAF Super Cup: 1 appearance

2015 – Champion

Players
Algerian teams are limited to two foreign players. The squad list includes only the principal nationality of each player;

Current squad
.

Reserve Squad

Personnel

Current technical staff

Notable players
Below are the notable former players who have represented ES Sétif in league and international competition since the club's foundation in 1958. To appear in the section below, a player must have played in at least 100 official matches for the club or represented the national team for which the player is eligible during his stint with ES Sétif or following his departure.

For a complete list of ES Sétif players, see :Category:ES Sétif players

Algeria
  Nacer Adjissa
  Laid Belhamel
  Isâad Bourahli
  Faouzi Chaouchi
  Abdelmoumene Djabou
  Lamouri Djediat
  Farès Fellahi
  Abderahmane Hachoud
  Lazhar Hadj Aïssa
  Samir Hadjaoui
  Nabil Hemani

Algeria
  Messaoud Koussim
  Abdelkader Laïfaoui
  Khaled Lemmouchia
  Kheïreddine Madoui
  Hocine Metref
  Antar Osmani
  Slimane Raho
  Abdelhamid Salhi
  Abdelhakim Serrar
  Abdelmalek Ziaya
  Malik Zorgane

Africa
  Francis Ambané
  Rémi Adiko
  Serey Die

Managerial history

List of managers
Information correct as of 19 February 2023. Only competitive matches are counted.

Rival Clubs
  MC Alger (Rivalry)
  CR Belouizdad (Rivalry)
  CS Constantine (Derby)
  JS Kabylie (Rivalry)
  MC El Eulma (Derby)
  CA Bordj Bou Arreridj (Derby)
  MO Béjaïa (Rivalry)

References

External links

 
Football clubs in Algeria
Sétif Province
Association football clubs established in 1958
Algerian Ligue Professionnelle 1 clubs
1958 establishments in Algeria
Sports clubs in Algeria
CAF Champions League winning clubs
CAF Super Cup winning clubs